HMS Finisterre was a  of the Royal Navy (RN). She was named after one of the battles of Cape Finisterre. She was the first and thus far the only ship of the Royal Navy to bear this name.

Finisterre was built by Fairfields of Govan on the Clyde. She was laid down on 8 December 1942, launched on 22 June 1944 and completed on 11 September 1945.

Operational service

Finnisterre first joined the Home Fleet upon her commissioning. After being in the Far East for some time, in which she performed a variety of duties there, Finisterre returned to the UK via the Mediterranean. In January 1950, Finisterre took part in the rescue attempt of the submarine , which had sunk after colliding with the Swedish merchant ship Divina in the Thames Estuary. The collision had resulted in the loss of 64 of those on board.

In 1953, Finisterre took part in the 1953 Coronation Fleet Review to celebrate the Coronation of Queen Elizabeth II. Finisterre was positioned adjacent to her sister ship .

The following year Finisterre was placed in Reserve. After her sister ship, collided with an Indian cruiser in August 1959, Finisterre replaced her in the 1st Destroyer Squadron, based in the Far East. She took over duties of her sister ship, to complete a tour of Australia over the Christmas period of 1959. Finisterre, as part of that squadron, subsequently saw service with the Home and Mediterranean Fleets. She was one of a number of Royal Navy ships stationed off Kuwait to keep the peace as the country gained its independence in 1961.

Decommissioning and disposal
She arrived for scrapping at the yard of W.H.Arnott Young Co. Ltd, Dalmuir on 12 June 1967.

References

Publications
 
 
 

 

Battle-class destroyers of the Royal Navy
Ships built in Govan
1944 ships
Cold War destroyers of the United Kingdom